Kristoffer Velde (born 9 September 1999) is a Norwegian professional footballer who plays as a winger for Ekstraklasa club Lech Poznań.

Career
Velde played youth football in Kopervik, spent the 2013 season in Vard's youth setup, returned to Kopervik before joining Haugesund in 2015. He made his senior debut in 2017. In 2017 he also featured for Norway U19.

In early January 2019 it was announced that Velde was loaned out to Nest-Sotra for the 2019 season. The loan was terminated in early April 2019.

He moved to Polish club Lech Poznań in January 2022.

Personal life
He is nicknamed "Veldinho".

Career statistics

Honours
Lech Poznań
 Ekstraklasa: 2021–22

References

1999 births
Living people
People from Karmøy
Sportspeople from Rogaland
Norwegian footballers
Association football midfielders
Norway youth international footballers
Eliteserien players
Ekstraklasa players
FK Haugesund players
Nest-Sotra Fotball players
Lech Poznań players
Norwegian expatriate footballers
Norwegian expatriate sportspeople in Poland
Expatriate footballers in Poland